Leto (minor planet designation: 68 Leto) is a large main belt asteroid that is orbiting the Sun with a period of 4.64 years. Its spectral type is S, suggesting a stony, silicate composition. The asteroid was discovered by German astronomer Robert Luther on April 29, 1861, and is named after Leto, the mother of Apollo and Artemis in Greek mythology. It has an estimated cross-sectional size of 123 km and a rotation period of 14.8 hours.

References

External links 
 
 

Background asteroids
Leto
Leto
Leto
S-type asteroids (Tholen)
18610429